The head of government is the highest or the second-highest official in the executive branch of a sovereign state, a federated state, or a self-governing colony, autonomous region, or other government who often presides over a cabinet, a group of ministers or secretaries who lead executive departments. In diplomacy, "head of government" is differentiated from "head of state" although in some countries, for example the United States, they are the same person.

The authority of a head of government, such as a president, chancellor, or prime minister, and the relationship between that position and other state institutions, such as the relation between the head of state and of the legislature, varies greatly among sovereign states, depending largely on the particular system of the government that has been chosen, won, or evolved over time.

In most parliamentary systems, including constitutional monarchies, the head of government is the de facto political leader of the government, and is answerable to at least one chamber of the legislature. Although there is often a formal reporting relationship to a head of state, the latter usually acts as a figurehead who may take the role of chief executive on limited occasions, either when receiving constitutional advice from the head of government or under specific provisions in a constitution.

In presidential republics or in absolute monarchies, the head of state is also usually the head of government. The relationship between that leader and the government, however, can vary greatly, ranging from separation of powers to autocracy, according to the constitution (or other basic laws) of the particular state.

In semi-presidential systems, the head of government may answer to both the head of state and the legislature with the specifics provided by each country's constitution. A modern example is the present French government, which originated as the French Fifth Republic in 1958.  In France, the president, the head of state, appoints the prime minister, who is the head of government.  However, the president must choose someone who can act effectively as an executive, but who also enjoys the support of France's legislature, the National Assembly, to be able to pass legislation. In some cases, the head of state may represent one political party but the majority in the National Assembly is of a different party. Given that the majority party has greater control over state funding and primary legislation, the president is in effect forced to choose a prime minister from the opposition party to ensure an effective, functioning legislature. In this case, known as cohabitation, the prime minister, along with the cabinet, controls domestic policy, with the president's influence largely restricted to foreign affairs.

In communist states, the General Secretary of the Communist Party is the supreme leader, serving as de facto head of state and government. In China, the de jure head of government is the Premier. The Chinese President is legally a ceremonial office, but the General Secretary of the Chinese Communist Party (top leader in a one-party system) has always held this office since 1993 except for the months of transition.

In directorial systems, the executive responsibilities of the head of government are spread among a group of people. A prominent example is the Swiss Federal Council, where each member of the council heads a department and also votes on proposals relating to all departments.

Titles of respective heads of government 

The most common title for a head of government is Prime Minister. This is used as a formal title in many states, but may also be an informal generic term to refer to whichever office is considered the principal minister under an otherwise styled head of state, as minister — Latin for servants or subordinates — is a common title for members of a government (but many other titles are in use, e.g. chancellor and secretary of state). Formally the head of state can also be the head of government as well (ex officio or by ad hoc cumulation, such as a ruling monarch exercising all powers himself) but otherwise has formal precedence over the head of government and other ministers, whether he is their actual political superior (ruling monarch, executive president) or rather theoretical or ceremonial in character (constitutional monarch, non-executive president). Various constitutions use different titles, and even the same title can have various multiple meanings, depending on the constitutional order and political system of the state in question.

As political chief 
In addition to prime minister, titles used for the democratic model, where there is an elected legislative body checking the head of government, include the following. Some of these titles relate to governments below the national level (e.g. states or provinces).

Alternative English terms and renderings 
 Chancellor (primarily in German-speaking countries; today used in Germany and Austria)
 Chief Minister (often subnational)
 Chief Executive (often subnational)
 First Minister (often subnational)
 Minister-President
 Premier (from French premier ministre)
 President of the Council of Ministers
 President of the Council of State
 President of the Executive Council
 President of the Government
 State Counsellor (used exclusively in Myanmar)
 State President (used exclusively in South Africa)

Equivalent titles in other languages 
 Albanian: Kryeministër
 Bengali: For the Prime Minister of Bangladesh প্রধানমন্ত্রী/Pradhan Mantri (official); সরকার প্রধান/Sarkar Pradhan (lit: Head of the Government, informal); সংসদ নেতা/Sangsad Neta (lit: Leader of the parliament; only in parliament)   
 Basque:
 Leader of the Basque Country (Spain): Eusko Jaurlaritzako lehendakaria (literally, 'President of the Basque Government')
 Leader of Navarre (Spain): Nafarroako Gobernuko lehendakaria (literally, 'President of the Government of Navarra')
 president, generically: Lehendakari
 Bulgarian: Министър-председател (transliteration: Ministar-predsedatel, literally 'Minister President')
 Catalan:
 For Andorra: Cap de Govern del Principat d'Andorra (literally: 'Head of Government of the Principality of Andorra')
 For the Balearic Islands (Spain): President/-a del Govern Balear
 For Catalonia (Spain): President/-a de la Generalitat de Catalunya (literally: 'President of the Generalitat of Catalonia')
 For Valencia (Spain): President/-a de la Generalitat Valenciana (literally: 'President of the Valencian Generalitat')
 The terms 'head of government' and 'prime minister', generically: cap de govern and primer ministre or primera ministra, respectively
 Chinese:
 For the Premier of China: 总理 (zǒnglǐ)
 Czech: Předseda vlády (literally: 'Chairman of the Government')
 Danish: Statsminister (literally: 'Minister of the State')
 Dutch:
 For the head of government of the Netherlands: Minister-President, Eerste Minister (literally, 'First Minister') or Premier
 For the head of government of Belgium, and as the term 'prime minister' generically: Eerste Minister or Premier
 Estonian: Peaminister
 Finnish: Pääministeri
 Filipino
 For the head of state and government (President) of the Philippines: Pangulo ng Pilipinas
 French:
 For France, Belgium and Canada: Prime Minister of France; Prime Minister of Belgium; Prime Minister of Canada: Premier Ministre or Première Ministre, also as the term 'prime minister' generically.
 For Switzerland: Conseil Fédéral (literally, the 'Federal Council', considered the head of government as a group)
 Galician (Spain): Presidente/-a da Xunta de Galicia (literally, 'President of the Council of Galicia')
 German:
 For Germany and Austria: Chancellor of Germany; Chancellor of Austria: Bundeskanzler (masc.) / Bundeskanzlerin (fem.)
 For Switzerland: Schweizerischer Bundesrat (literally, the 'Swiss Federal Council', considered the head of government as a group)
 The term 'head of government,' generically: Regierungschef/-in
 The term 'prime minister,' generically: Ministerpräsident/-in; or Premierminister/-in
 historically: Leitender Minister ('Senior Minister')
 Greek: Πρωθυπουργός (transliteration: Prothipourgos)
 Hebrew: ראש הממשלה (transliteration: Rosh HaMemshala)
 Hindi/Hindustani/Urdu:
 The term 'head of government', generically: शासनप्रमुख (translit. Śāsanapramukha), literally:'Chief of government'
 The term 'Prime Minister', generically: प्रधानमन्त्री (translit. Pradhānamantrī), literally:'Chief of Ministers/Prime Minister'
 The other Hindustani term generically used for 'Prime Minister'(now used officially only in Pakistan with Urdu as official language) : वज़ीर-ए-आज़म/ (translit. Wazīr-ē-Āzam), lit.:'Grand Vizier/Prime Minister'
 For 'Prime Minister of India' : भारतीय प्रधानमन्त्री/भारत के प्रधानमन्त्री (translit. Bhāratiya Pradhānamantrī/Bhārat Kē Pradhānamantrī), translation:'Indian Prime Minister/Prime Minister of India'(this term is used by the Government of the Union and the State Governments of India, under the umbrella of "Hindi Language"); 
 For 'Prime Minister of Pakistan': / (translit. Wazīr-ē-Āzam Pākistān/Pākistān Kē Wazīr-ē-Āzam), This is the term used in India and Pakistan under the umbrella of Urdu, the Hindi term being, पाकिस्तानी प्रधानमन्त्री/पाकिस्तान के प्रधानमन्त्री (translit.Pākistānī Pradhānamantrī/Pākistān Kē Pradhānamantrī)
 Historically, various terms like Pradhānamantrī, Pradhān, Pantapradhān, Sadr-ē-Riyāsat, Sadr, Wazīr-ē-Āzam, Wazīr-ē-Ālā, Mahāmantrī, Wazīr-ē-Khazānā, Pēśwā, Dīwān, Dīwān Sāhib, Dīwān Bahādur, Dīwān Pramukh, Sadr-ul-Maham, Pantapramukh, Ālāmantrī, etc. have been used by various Empires, Kingdoms and Princely States of India as a title for the Prime Minister, some of these titles were also used by the sovereign of various kingdoms.
 Hungarian: Miniszterelnök
 Irish: Leader of Ireland: Taoiseach
 Italian:
 For the head of government of Italy: Presidente del Consiglio dei Ministri della Repubblica Italiana (literally, 'President of the Council of Ministers of the Italian Republic')
 When referring to other prime ministers: Primo ministro or Prima ministra (masculine and feminine forms; literally 'prime minister')
 For Switzerland: Consiglio Federale (literally, the 'Federal Council', considered the head of government as a group)
 Japanese:
 For the head of government of Japan (Prime Minister): 内閣総理大臣 (Naikaku Sōri-Daijin) or 首相 (Shushō)
 Khmer:
 For the Prime Minister of Cambodia: នាយករដ្ឋមន្ត្រី (Neayuk rothmontrey)
 Korean:
 For the President of South Korea: Daetongryung
 For the Prime Minister of South Korea: Chongni(총리) or Gukmu Chonhni(국무총리)
 Latvian:
 For the head of government of Latvia: Ministru prezidents (literally, 'Minister President')
 When referring to other prime ministers: Premjerministrs
 Lithuanian: Ministras pirmininkas
 Malay: 
In Malaysia, the Prime Minister of Malaysia is Perdana Menteri. The head of government of the constituent states are either Ketua Menteri, "chief minister" in the Malaysian states without a monarchy (Malacca, Penang, Sabah and Sarawak), or Menteri Besar "first minister" in the sultanates and other monarchic states.
 Maltese: In Malta, the head of government is "Prim Ministru".
 Māori: Pirimia, (literally, 'Premier', the former title for the Prime Minister of New Zealand.)
 Norwegian: Statsminister
 Polish:
 For the head of government of Poland: Prezes Rady Ministrów ('President of Council of Ministers', literally: 'Chairman of the Council of Ministers')
 For the term 'prime minister' in general: Premier (also, informally, to the head of government of Poland)
 Portuguese:
 For Brazil: Presidente/-a da República Federativa do Brasil (literally, 'President of the Federal Republic of Brazil')
 For Portugal and as the term 'prime minister' in general: Primeiro-ministro or Primeira-ministra (masculine and feminine forms, literally 'prime minister' or 'first minister')
 Romanian: Prim-ministru
 Russian: Prem'yer-ministr
 Sinhalese: ශ්‍රී ලංකා අග්‍රාමාත්‍ය Shri Lanka Agramathya (literally: 'Sri Lanka Prime Minister')
 Slovak: Predseda vlády (literally: 'Chairman of the Government')
 Slovene: Predsednik Vlade (literally: 'Chairman of the Government')
 Spanish:
 For the head of government of Spain: Presidente/-a del gobierno de España (literally: 'President of the Government')
 When referring to other prime ministers: Primer ministro or Primera Ministra (masculine and feminine forms; literally 'prime minister')
 The term 'head of government', generically: jefe del gobierno
 Swahili: Sultan
 Swedish: Statsminister ("prime minister", literally: "state minister")
 Thai:
 For the head of government (Prime Minister) of Thailand: Nayok rathamontri
 Turkish: Başbakan

Under a dominant head of state 
In a broader sense, a head of government can be used loosely when referring to various comparable positions under a dominant head of state (especially is the case of ancient or feudal eras, so the term "head of government", in this case, could be considered a contradiction in terms). In this case, the prime minister serves at the pleasure of the monarch and holds no more power than the monarch allows. Some such titles are diwan, mahamantri, pradhan, wasir or vizier.

However, just because the head of state is the de jure dominant position does not mean that he/she will not always be the de facto political leader. A skilled head of government like 19th-century German statesman Otto von Bismarck, Minister President of Prussia and later Chancellor of Germany under Emperor/King Wilhelm I, serves as an example showing that possession of formal powers does not equal political influence.

Indirectly referred as the head of state 
In some cases, the head of state is a figurehead whilst the head of the government leads the ruling party. In some cases a head of government may even pass on the title in hereditary fashion. Such titles include the following:
 Mayor of the palace of the Merovingian kingdoms
 Nawab wasir of the Mughal Empire (also governor of Awadh)
 Peshwa of Satara and the Maratha empire
 Shōgun in feudal Japan
 Sultan in the original case of the Seljuk Turks who made the caliphs of Baghdad their puppets; later both styles were often used for absolute rulers in Nepal

Combined heads of state and government 

In some models the head of state and head of government are one and the same. These include:
 President (chief executive)
 An absolute monarch reigning and ruling without a separate principal minister
 Chief magistrate
 Führer (used in Nazi Germany for Adolf Hitler)
 Supreme leader
 A State Governor in the United States (subnational executives)
An alternative formula is a single chief political body (e.g., presidium) which collectively leads the government and provides (e.g. by turns) the ceremonial Head of state. The only state in which this system is currently employed is Switzerland but other countries such as Uruguay have employed it in the past. This system is described as the directorial system.
 Sultan of Brunei
 King of Saudi Arabia
See Head of state for further explanation of these cases.

Parliamentary heads of government 

In parliamentary systems, government functions along the following lines:
 The head of government — usually the leader of the majority party or coalition — forms the government, which is answerable to parliament;
 Full answerability of government to parliament is achieved through
 The ability of parliament to pass a vote of no confidence.
 The ability to vote down legislative proposals of the government.
 Control over or ability to vote down fiscal measures and the budget (or supply); a government is powerless without control of the state finances. In a bicameral system, it is often the so-called lower house (e.g. the British House of Commons) that exercises the major elements of control and oversight; however, in some (e.g. Australia, Italy), the government is constitutionally or by convention answerable to both chambers/Houses of Parliament.

All of these requirements directly impact the head of government's role. Consequently, they often play a 'day to day' role in parliament, answering questions and defending the government on the 'floor of the House', while in semi-presidential systems they may not be required to play as much of a role in the functioning of parliament.

Appointment 
In many countries, the head of government is commissioned by the head of state to form a government, on the basis of the strength of party support in the lower house; in some other states, the head of government is directly elected by parliament. Many parliamentary systems require ministers to serve in parliament, while others ban ministers from sitting in parliament (they must resign on becoming ministers).

Removal 
Heads of government are typically removed from power in a parliamentary system by
 Resignation, following:
 Defeat in a general election.
 Defeat in a leadership vote at their party caucus, to be replaced by another member of the same party.
 Defeat in a parliamentary vote on a major issue, e.g., loss of supply, loss of confidence. (In such cases, a head of government may seek a parliamentary dissolution from the head of state and attempt to regain support by popular vote.)
 Dismissal — some constitutions allow a head of state (or their designated representative, as is the case in some Commonwealth countries) to dismiss a head of government, though its use can be controversial, as occurred in 1975 when then Australian Governor-General, Sir John Kerr, dismissed Prime Minister Gough Whitlam in the Australian Constitutional Crisis.
 Death — in this case, the deputy head of government typically acts as the head of government until a new head of government is appointed.

First among equals or dominating the cabinet? 
Constitutions differ in the range and scope of powers granted to the head of government. Some older constitutions; for example, Australia's 1900 text, and Belgium's 1830 text; do not mention their prime ministerial offices at all, the offices became a de facto political reality without a formal constitutional status. Some constitutions make a Prime Minister  (first among equals) and that remains the practical reality for the Prime Minister of Belgium and the Prime Minister of Finland. Other states however, make their head of government a central and dominant figure within the cabinet system; Ireland's Taoiseach, for example, alone can decide when to seek a parliamentary dissolution, in contrast to other countries where this is a cabinet decision, with the Prime Minister just one member voting on the suggestion. In Israel, while the Government is nominally a collegiate body with a  role for the Prime Minister, the Israeli Prime Minister is the dominant figure in the executive branch in practice. The Prime Minister of Sweden, under the 1974 Instrument of Government, is a constitutional office with all key executive powers either directly at his or her disposal or indirectly through the collegial Government, whose members are all appointed and dismissed at the Prime Minister's sole discretion.

Under the unwritten British constitution, the prime minister's role has evolved, based often on the individual's personal appeal and strength of character, as contrasted between, for example, Winston Churchill as against Clement Attlee, Margaret Thatcher as against John Major. It is alleged that the increased personalisation of leadership in a number of states has led to heads of government becoming themselves "semi-presidential" figures, due in part to media coverage of politics that focuses on the leader and his or her mandate, rather than on parliament; and to the increasing centralisation of power in the hands of the head of government. Such allegations have been made against three former British Prime ministers: Margaret Thatcher, Tony Blair, and Boris Johnson. They were also made against Italian prime ministers Silvio Berlusconi and Matteo Renzi, Canadian prime minister Pierre Trudeau and Federal Chancellor of West Germany (later all of Germany), Helmut Kohl, when in power.

Official residence 

The head of government is often provided with an official residence, often in the same fashion as heads of state often are. The name of the residence is often used as a metonym or alternative title for 'the government' when the office is politically the highest, e.g. in the UK "Downing Street announced today…"

Well-known official residences of heads of government include:
 10 Downing Street in London — Prime Minister of the United Kingdom (who also has a country residence, Chequers)
 The Lodge in Canberra — Prime Minister of Australia (with an additional residence, Kirribilli House, in Sydney)
 24 Sussex Drive in Ottawa — Prime Minister of Canada (who also has a country residence, Harrington Lake)
 Premier House in Wellington — Prime Minister of New Zealand
 7, Lok Kalyan Marg in New Delhi — Prime Minister of India
 Catshuis in The Hague — Prime Minister of the Netherlands
 Ballhausplatz in Vienna — Chancellor of Austria
 Zhongnanhai in Beijing — Premier of the People's Republic of China
 Kantei in Tokyo — Prime Minister of Japan
 Kramář's Villa in Prague — Prime Minister of the Czech Republic
 Chigi Palace in Rome — Prime Minister of Italy
 Hôtel Matignon in Paris— Prime Minister of France
 Villa Parkowa in Warsaw— Prime Minister of Poland 
 Federal Chancellery in Berlin — Chancellor of Germany
 The Lambermont in Brussels — Prime Minister of Belgium
 Palacio de la Moncloa in Madrid — President of the Government of Spain
 Palacete de São Bento in Lisbon — Prime Minister of Portugal
 Kesäranta in Helsinki — Prime Minister of Finland
 Sager House in Stockholm — Prime Minister of Sweden (who also has a country residence, Harpsund)
 Grand Kremlin Palace in Moscow — Prime Minister of Russia
 Palace of the Governorate in Vatican City — Governorate of the Vatican City State
Similarly, heads of government of federal entities below the level of the sovereign state (often without an actual head of state, at least under international law) may also be given an official residence, sometimes used as an opportunity to display aspirations of statehood:
 Hotel Errera in Brussels — Minister-President of the Flemish community and region
 Bavarian State Chancellery –  Minister-President of the State of Bavaria
 Élysette in Namur — Minister-President of Wallonia
 Bute House, Edinburgh; First Minister of Scotland
 Hesse State Chancellery, Wiesbaden; Minister-President of the State of Hesse
 Kazan Kremlin, Kazan – President of Tatarstan
 Government House, Hong Kong – Chief Executive of Hong Kong
 Macau Government Headquarters – Chief Executive of Macau
 Red City Hall – Governing Mayor of Berlin
 Quinta Vigia – President of the Regional Government of Madeira

Usually, the residence of the heads of government is not as prestigious and grand as that of the head of state, even if the head of state only performs ceremonial duties. Even the formal representative of the head of state, such as a governor-general, may well be housed in a grander, palace-type residence. However, this is not the case when both positions are combined into one:
 The White House (1600 Pennsylvania Avenue) in Washington, D.C. — President of the United States of America
 The Blue House (1 Sejongno Jongno-gu) in Seoul — President of South Korea
 Istana Nurul Iman in Bandar Seri Begawan — Sultan of Brunei
 Palácio da Alvorada in Brasília — President of the Federative Republic of Brazil

Statistics 

 World's longest serving unelected head of government: Prince Khalifa bin Salman Al Khalifa, Prime Minister of Bahrain from 1971 to 2020.
 World's longest serving monarchical head of government: Hun Sen, Prime Minister of Cambodia from 1998 to present.
 World's longest serving republican head of government: Lee Kuan Yew, Prime Minister of Singapore from 1959 to 1990.
 World's longest serving female head of government: Sheikh Hasina, Prime Minister of Bangladesh from 1996 to 2002 and from 2009 to date.

See also 

 Head of state
 Government
 List of current heads of state and government
 List of current prime ministers by date of assumption of office
 European Council
 Chief executive officer and Chief operating officer
 Power behind the throne
 Éminence grise
 Air transports of heads of state and government
 Official Portraits (book)
 World Leaders

Notes

References

Citations

Citations 

 Jean Blondel & Ferdinand Muller-Rommel Cabinets in Western Europe

 
Executive ministers
Government institutions